Redfearn Sports F.C. was an English football club based in Monk Bretton, South Yorkshire.

History 
It is not known when the club was first formed, but Redfearns F.C., representing the Redfearns Glassworks in Monk Bretton, entered the FA Cup on three occasions before the First World War. As a Barnsley League club, they changed name to Redfearn Sports F.C. and won the prestigious Sheffield & Hallamshire Senior Cup in 1969, beating Frickley Athletic at Denaby United's Tickhill Square ground. In 1973 they entered the Yorkshire Football League as Redfearn National Glass, and in their first season won the League Cup and promotion to the Second Division. A second successive promotion was earned in 1975, but the club withdrew from the league in 1977, returning to the Barnsley League.

In 1982 they won the Sheffield & Hallamshire Junior Cup, and were runners-up in the same competition in 1991, having reverted to being called Redfearn Sports. Soon after, the club disbanded.

League and cup history

Honours

League 
 Yorkshire League Division Two
 Runners-up: 1974–75
 Yorkshire League Division Three
 Promoted: 1973–74

Cup 
 Sheffield & Hallamshire Senior Cup
 Winners: 1968–69
 Yorkshire Football League Cup
 Winners: 1973–74

Records 
 Best FA Cup performance: Preliminary Round, 1911–12, 1912–13, 1913–14
 Best FA Vase performance: 2nd Round, 1976–77

References 

Defunct football clubs in England
Defunct football clubs in South Yorkshire
Doncaster & District Senior League
Yorkshire Football League
Barnsley Association League
Association football clubs disestablished in the 1990s
Works association football teams in England